ZNF703 is a gene which has been linked with the development of breast cancers.  ZNF703 is contained within the NET/N1z family responsible for regulation of transcription essential for developmental growth especially in the hindbrain.  Normal functions performed by ZNF703 include adhesion, movement and proliferation of cells.  ZNF703 directly accumulates histone deacetylases at gene promoter regions but does not bind to functional DNA.

Following research by scientists at Cancer Research UK, it was the first oncogene discovery in the past six years.

ZNF703 is a part of 8p12 telomeric amplicon that is associated with Luminal B breast cancer. Recently, ZNF703 is identified as the driver of 8p12 locus amplification.

Patients diagnosed with luminal B cancer caused by ZNF703 typically have lower recovery and survival rates than other cancer types.

Drug resistance of ZNF703 has been displayed when patients are treated using anti-cancer drug Tamoxifen.

Discovery 
Researchers discovered the carcinogenic nature of ZNF703 in 2011 while conducting research on the classification and resistance of various oncogenes.  Researchers attempted to discern factors associated with various cancer types through observation of the oncogenic mechanism on a molecular scale.  The luminal B cancer pathway exhibited an amplification of 5 different genomic areas including the chromosome region 8p12.  Amplification of region 8p12 occurred through transcriptional regulation of ZNF703.

Location 

ZNF703 is located on human chromosome 8 at the short arm region commonly named chromosome region 8p12.  Tumors generated by ZNF703 have shown loss in size beginning at the telomere and ending at 8p12 while the 8p12-11 region has increased size.  A fluctuation between increase and decrease is present along the 8p12-8p21 boundary region of the chromosome.  A pattern has been found that involves three similar regions of disrupted growth and four regions of enhanced growth starting from the telomere and ending at the centromere.

Role in cancer 
The ZNF703 gene generally plays an active role in luminal B tumor cells contained in mammary ducts.  Typically, ZNF703 expression is greater when the tumors are estrogen receptor positive as opposed to estrogen receptor negative.  ZNF703 is co-expressed in a nuclear complex containing genes DCAF7, NCRO2 and PHB2.  ZNF703 generates a nuclear protein responsible for oestrogen receptor associated protein repression.  Gene expression of stem cells are triggered when the ZNF703 gene becomes overexpressed in the complex.  As a result, both regular cells and cancer stem cell abundance increases rapidly.  ZNF703 overexpression also causes primary and secondary tumorsphere development alongside amplified production of CD49F- positive cells associated with colon cancer.

ZNF703 also experiences target regulation of cancer cells through the transcription of RNA SPRY4-It1.   RNA SPRY4-IT1 is a non-coding gene responsible for preventing apoptosis and generating large tumors.

Researchers recently established a link between the trigger gene ZNF703 and Akt/mTOR pathway activation involved in the cellular cycle resulting in lung tumor formation.

Prognosis 
The lifespan of individuals with colorectal cancer and luminal cancer have different prognosis depending on the amount of expression of the ZNF703 gene.  Low amounts of transcription of ZNF703 usually leads to a healthier prognosis than individuals experiencing higher levels of transcription of the oncogene.  ZNF703 is a target for therapeutic medicines since survival rates increase as transcription rates decrease.

Resistance to drugs 
The drug Tamoxifen is a commonly administered drug used to treat luminal cancers in patients.   Half of patients treated with Tamoxifen are resistant to the drug.  Overexpression of ZNF703 has been linked to Tamoxifen resistance.  As transcription of the ZNF703 gene reaches substantial levels, instead of blocking cell proliferation, Tamoxifen is found to increase cancer cell division.  Tamoxifen can only be given at low dosages and patients are monitored daily in order to avoid tumor growth.

References 

Estrogen regulation